Omkoi Subdistrict is a tambon (subdistrict) of Omkoi District, in Chiang Mai Province, Thailand. In 2017 it had a population of 18,202 people.

Administration

Central administration
The tambon is divided into 20 administrative villages (mubans).

Local administration
The area of the subdistrict is governed by two local governments.
 Subdistrict municipality (thesaban tambon) Omkoi (เทศบาลตำบลอมก๋อย)
 subdistrict administrative organization (SAO) Omkoi (องค์การบริหารส่วนตำบลอมก๋อย)

References

External links
Thaitambon.com on Omkoi

Tambon of Chiang Mai province
Populated places in Chiang Mai province